was a Japanese statesman in the Meiji and Taishō periods.

Biography
Shōda was born in Matsuyama Domain, Iyo Province on October 19 1869, as the 5th son of a poor samurai. The poet Masaoka Shiki and admiral Akiyama Saneyuki were his friends from childhood. He graduated from Tokyo Imperial University in 1895, and obtained a position at the Ministry of Finance. In 1915, he rose to the position of director of the Bank of Chosen.  He was appointed Finance Minister under the Terauchi and Kiyoura administrations,  and Education Minister under the Tanaka administration. In 1938, he was considered for the post of Home Minister under the 2nd Konoe administration, a somewhat surprising choice, given his age and lack of experience in the Home Ministry, and the nomination was rejected by Emperor Hirohito.  

He died on October 10, 1948.

References 
Beasley. W.G. Japanese Imperialism 1894-1945. Oxford University Press (1991) 
Metzler, Mark. Lever of Empire: The International Gold Standard and the Crisis of Liberalism in Prewar Japan. University of California Press (2006).

Notes

1869 births
1948 deaths
People from Matsuyama, Ehime
University of Tokyo alumni
Ministers of Finance of Japan
Government ministers of Japan
Education ministers of Japan